The 2017 PCCL National Collegiate Championship is the ninth edition of the Philippine Collegiate Champions League (PCCL) in its current incarnation, the postseason tournament to determine the national collegiate champions in basketball. The tournament will be the ninth edition in its current incarnation, and the 14th edition overall.

Format
Eight teams will compete in the national championship to be held in Metro Manila in February 2018. The finalists of the recently concluded NCAA and UAAP basketball championships, as well as the champion of the CESAFI basketball championship will automatically qualify in the tournament. Qualifying tournaments for the three remaining slots were held for Mindanao, Luzon and Metro Manila.

Qualifying teams

Automatic qualifiers

Regional qualifiers

Regional qualifiers results

South Luzon

North Luzon

North Luzon/South Luzon knockout

Mindanao

NCR
The NCR Regional Qualifiers were held at the Jose Rizal University (JRU) gymnasium from January 15 to 18.

Group A

Group B

Finals

Elite Eight

Group A

Group B

Final Four

Semifinals

Finals

Awards
The awardees are:
Most Valuable Player: Jaycee Marcelino (Lyceum)
Mythical Five:
Jaycee Marcelino (Lyceum)
Javee Mocon (San Beda)
Pierre Donald Tankoua (San Beda)
CJ Perez (Lyceum)
Mike Nzeusseu (Lyceum)

References

External links
2017 PCCL NCC results

2017-18
2017–18 in Philippine basketball leagues